The 1984 Cork Intermediate Football Championship was the 49th staging of the Cork Intermediate Football Championship since its establishment by the Cork County Board in 1909. The draw for the opening round fixtures took place on 29 January 1984. The championship ran from 22 April to 16 September 1984.

The final was played on 16 September 1984 at the Ballinspittle Grounds, between Midleton and O'Donovan Rossa, in what was their first ever meeting in the final. Midleton won the match by 2-11 to 1-12 to claim their first ever championship title.

O'Donovan Rossa's Mick McCarthy was the championship's top scorer with 1-34.

Results

First round

Second round

Quarter-finals

Semi-finals

Final

Championship statistics

Top scorers

Overall

In a single game

References

Cork Intermediate Football Championship